"Ecstasy" is a house song by singer, Jody Watley. It was written by Watley, David Morales and Terry Burrus and produced by Morales (who'd worked with Watley previously on her hit single, "I'm the One You Need"). It first appeared on the 1993 album, Intimacy.

History
Released as a promotional single to dance clubs and DJs in 1994, a Bad Yard Club remix of "Ecstasy" (by David Morales) appeared on the U.K. CD-single  of "When a Man Loves a Woman"; this version would later appear on Watley's 1996 Greatest Hits compilation. Also, "Ecstasy" was included on a two-track Victor Japanese 3-inch CD single along with the Goro Inagaki song, "If You Give Your Heart".

References

External links

Jody Watley songs
1994 songs
Songs written by Jody Watley
Songs written by David Morales